Gábor Borsos (born 30 June 1991) is a Hungarian tennis player.

Borsos has a career high ATP singles ranking of 551 achieved on 14 January 2019. He also has a career high ATP doubles ranking of 188, achieved on 13 November 2017. Borsos has won 25 ITF doubles titles.
 
Borsos has represented Hungary at Davis Cup, where he has a win–loss record of 2–5.

Tour doubles titles – all levels (25)

Davis Cup

Participations: (2–5)

   indicates the outcome of the Davis Cup match followed by the score, date, place of event, the zonal classification and its phase, and the court surface.

External links 
 
 
 

1991 births
Living people
Hungarian male tennis players
Sportspeople from Székesfehérvár
People from Siófok
20th-century Hungarian people
21st-century Hungarian people